High Priority is the second studio album by American singer Cherrelle.  Released on October 20, 1985, it reached #9 on the Top R&B/Hip-Hop albums chart and #36 on the Billboard 200.  It generated Cherrelle's biggest pop hit with her duet with Alexander O'Neal, "Saturday Love" which peaked at #26 on the Billboard Hot 100.

Background
After the success of her debut album, Fragile, Cherrelle returned to the studio to record her second album.  She worked predominantly with Jimmy Jam & Terry Lewis again on this project, and co-wrote and co-produced the track "Where Do I Run To" herself.

Reception

The uptempo lead single, "You Look Good to Me" would reach #26 on the Hot R&B/Hip-Hop Songs chart.  The second single was "Saturday Love," which would go on to be a hit peaking at #2 on the R&B charts, Cherrelle's best showing to that point, and would cross over and reach #26 on the Billboard Hot 100.  It would also go on to huge popularity in the UK, climbing to #6 on the UK Singles Chart, becoming one of Cherrelle's most recognizable hits.  Subsequent singles, the slow jam "Will You Satisfy?" would peak at #57 on the UK Singles Chart and "Artificial Heart" would reach #18 on the R&B chart and become Cherrelle's biggest hit on the Hot Dance Club Play chart at #5.

Track listing

Charts

Weekly charts

Year-end charts

References

1985 albums
Cherrelle albums
Albums produced by Jimmy Jam and Terry Lewis
Tabu Records albums